We Got This is the third studio album by Dutch three-piece girl group O'G3NE. It was released in the Netherlands on 30 September 2016 by BMG. The album peaked at number 1 on the Dutch Albums Chart. The album will be re-released on 28 April 2017 and will include their Eurovision song "Lights and Shadows".

Singles
"Take the Money and Run" was released as the lead single from the album on 29 April 2016. The song peaked at number 30 on the Dutch Singles Chart. "Loved You First" was released as the second single from the album on 16 September 2016. "Lights and Shadows" was released as the lead single from the re-released album on 3 March 2017. The song peaked at number 53 on the Dutch Singles Chart. On 29 October 2016, AVROTROS announced that O'G3NE will represent the Netherlands at the 2017 Eurovision Song Contest. The Netherlands will compete in the second semi-final at the Eurovision Song Contest.

Track listing

Charts

Weekly charts

Year-end charts

Release history

References

2016 albums